The fifth season of the Canadian reality competition show Top Chef Canada was broadcast on Food Network in Canada. It was an all-star edition of the Canadian spin-off of Bravo's hit show Top Chef. The program filmed in Toronto, and was hosted by Eden Grinshpan.

Contestants

Contestant Progress 

: Starting from this quickfire, immunity is no longer available.
: The finale Quickfire was a High Stakes Quickfire with the losing chef being eliminated.

 (WINNER) The chef won the season and was crowned Top Chef.
 (RUNNER-UP) The chef was a runner-up for the season.
 (THIRD-PLACE) The chef placed third in the competition.
 (WIN) The chef won that episode's Elimination Challenge.
 (HIGH) The chef was selected as one of the top entries in the Elimination Challenge, but did not win.
 (LOW) The chef was selected as one of the bottom entries in the Elimination Challenge, but was not eliminated.
 (OUT) The chef lost that week's Elimination Challenge and was out of the competition.
 (IN) The chef neither won nor lost that week's Elimination Challenge. They also were not up to be eliminated.

Episodes

References

Canada, Season 5
2017 Canadian television seasons